Dinmore railway station served the villages of Bodenham and Hope under Dinmore, Herefordshire, England between 1853 and 1958.

History
The main line of the Shrewsbury and Hereford Railway was authorised in 1846, and opened in two stages. It was just to the south of Dinmore Tunnel, which passes under Dinmore Hill.

Dinmore station closed on 9 June 1958, but the line remains open as part of the Welsh Marches Line.

References

Further reading

External links
Dinmore Station on navigable 1952 O.S. map

Disused railway stations in Herefordshire
Former Shrewsbury and Hereford Railway stations
Railway stations in Great Britain opened in 1853
Railway stations in Great Britain closed in 1958